Power in Black is the first demo from American thrash metal band Overkill in 1983, although some songs had been recorded previously, such as "The Beast Within". Three of the songs from this demo ("Overkill", "There's No Tomorrow" and "Raise the Dead") were re-recorded for Overkill's debut Feel the Fire, while "The Beast Within" and "Death Rider" have never been re-recorded on future albums.

Track listing

Side one
 "Overkill" – 3:23  
 "The Beast Within" – 4:05  
 "There's No Tomorrow" – 3:35

Side two
 "Death Rider" – 3:50  
 "Raise the Dead" – 3:13

Personnel
 Bobby "Blitz" Ellsworth – vocals
 Bobby Gustafson – guitars
 D.D. Verni – bass
 Rat Skates – drums

External links
 Official OVERKILL Site

Overkill (band) albums
Demo albums
1983 albums